Chan may refer to:

Places
Chan (commune), Cambodia
Chan Lake, by Chan Lake Territorial Park in Northwest Territories, Canada

People
Chan (surname), romanization of various Chinese surnames (including 陳, 曾, 詹, 戰, and 田)
Chan Caldwell (1920–2000), Canadian football coach
Chan Gailey (born 1952), American football coach
Chan Kai-kit (born 1952), Macanese businessman
Chan Reec Madut, South Sudanese jurist
Chan Romero (born 1941), American rock and roll singer, songwriter, and musicians
Chan Santokhi (born 1959), President of Suriname and former chief of police
Bang Chan (born 1997), member of the South Korean boy band Stray Kids
Heo Chan (born 1995), member of the South Korean boy band Victon
Ta Chan, nom de guerre of Cambodian war criminal Mam Nai

Computing and media
chan-, an abbreviation for channels in Internet Relay Chat (IRC)
chan, a common suffix for the title of an imageboard

As an acronym/initialism 
African Nations Championship or Championnat d'Afrique des Nations (CHAN), an African football tournament
CHAN-DT, a TV station in Vancouver, Canada

Other uses
Chan Buddhism (禅), a school of Mahayana Buddhism
-chan, a Japanese suffix which expresses endearment
Chan, a form of Thai poetry
"Chans" (Kent song)
Chan, the plant Hyptis suaveolens, a relative of mint also known as "pignut"

See also
Chen (surname), pronounced in Cantonese as Chan (陳)
Chung (surname)